Protonibea diacanthus, commonly known as the blackspotted croaker, and in Australia as the black jewfish, is a species of fish native to the Indo-Pacific region.

Commercial importance 
The fish is considered a delicacy, it is prized in East Asia because even though there is no evidence, some people actually think its organs are medicinal. The fish are most expensive in countries like Singapore, Malaysia, Indonesia, Hong Kong and Japan.

The most expensive known catch of a blackspotted croaker was made by two Indian fishermen near the Mumbai-Palghar coastline; the fish weighing 30 kg.

Local name of these fish is ghol fish and their value depends on gender, a 30 kg male fish can be 4-5 lakh and a female one 1-2 lakh. The value varies according to size and thickness of the fishes internal organs (called bhot). In satpati Mumbai, the price of bhot is around 5-6 lakh/kg and meat 500-600 Rs/kg.

This fish is known locally as Telia in Odia, and in 2020, fishermen from Odisha caught one weighing around 19.5 kg. A pharmaceutical company purchased it ₹8000 per kg in an auction. Similarly in 2019, another fishermen from Odisha caught a 10 kg fish and was sold ₹10,000 per kg.

References

External links
 Blackspotted Croaker @ Fishes of Australia

Sciaenidae
Fish of the Indian Ocean
Fish of South Asia
Marine fish of Southeast Asia
Marine fish of Northern Australia
Fish described in 1802